Francisca Remedios Loza Alvarado (21 August 1949 – 14 December 2018) was a Bolivian artisan, television presenter and politician.

Biography 
Remedios Loza was born in La Paz on 21 August 1949, the eldest of eleven siblings. She wove art pieces for Alasitas. After hearing her native Aymara language on the radio for the first time in September 1965, Loza turned to the medium herself, and later became a television presenter. While working in media, Loza met Carlos Palenque. She became the first person of indigenous descent to be seated in the Bolivian National Congress. Loza was a member of the Conscience of Fatherland (CONDEPA) and represented La Paz between 1989 and 2002. She ran on CONDEPA presidential ticket twice, as vice presidential candidate to Palenque in 1993, and as the party's presidential candidate in 1997, following Palenque's death.

Loza died of stomach cancer on 14 December 2018, and was honored with a state funeral at the Plurinational Legislative Assembly on 17 December 2018.

References

1949 births
2018 deaths
Deaths from cancer in Bolivia
Deaths from stomach cancer
Women members of the Chamber of Deputies (Bolivia)
Members of the Chamber of Deputies (Bolivia)
20th-century Bolivian women politicians
20th-century Bolivian politicians
21st-century Bolivian women politicians
21st-century Bolivian politicians
People from La Paz
Aymara people
Conscience of Fatherland politicians
Candidates for President of Bolivia